DNV may refer to:

 DNV, an international accredited registrar and classification society for maritime shipping
 Vermilion Regional Airport (IATA airport code: DNV), Danville, Illinois, U.S.
 Intha-Danu language (ISO 639 language code: dnv)
 Richard "DNV" Sohl (1953–1990), American musician

See also